Baba Fernandes (born 3 July 2000) is a professional footballer who plays for Accrington Stanley as a defender. Born in Guinea-Bissau, Fernandes represented Portugal at youth international level.

Club career
On 28 December 2018, Fernandes made his professional debut with Vitória Setúbal in a 2018–19 Taça da Liga match against 
Braga. On 10 June 2022, Nottingham Forest announced Fernandes would be leaving the club once his contract expired.

In August 2022 he signed for Accrington Stanley.

References

External links

2000 births
Living people
Portuguese footballers
Portugal youth international footballers
Bissau-Guinean footballers
Portuguese sportspeople of Bissau-Guinean descent
Bissau-Guinean emigrants to Portugal
Association football defenders
Vitória F.C. players
Nottingham Forest F.C. players
Accrington Stanley F.C. players